Oiretumu (also known as Areora-Makatea) is a village on Mauke in the Cook Islands. The village is inland, near the centre of the island.

The village has a Cook Islands Christian Church.

References

Mauke
Populated places in the Cook Islands